Phanerotoma is a genus of braconid wasps in the family Braconidae. There are at least 190 described species in Phanerotoma.

See also
 List of Phanerotoma species

References

Further reading

External links

 

Parasitic wasps